Gert Åke Fylking (born 7 October 1945) is a Swedish actor, journalist, politician (Christian Democrat) and host of the radio programme Gert's Värld on Radio 1 101,9 FM, where he is known by the nickname of Fylking Sverige (a handle translatable as Your Man Fylking of Sweden). He has participated in many theatre productions, films and TV programmes. He is married to Tanja Fylking; they have six children and live in Stockholm. Among his friends are Robert Aschberg, Hasse Aro and Lennart Jähkel, and especially the late Christer Pettersson (since their childhood).

Live 
Fylking grew up in Stockholm and spent large parts of his youth in the Stockholm Archipelago. He joined the Swidish Forces at the Älvsborg Coastal Artillery Regiment (KA 4) in Gothenburg in 1966. He was then sent as a platoon commander to the "Coastal Hunter" School at Vaxholm's Coastal Artillery Regiment (KA 1). He enrolled in the Royal Naval Academy. 

Fylking has previously been noted for its association with the nation-wide known criminal and addict Christer Pettersson.

Radio host 
Presently, together with Titti Schultz and Roger Nordin, Gert Fylking is anchorman of the show noted above. He is also known for bursting out in a loud sarcastic exclamation ("Äntligen!" - meaning: "Finally!") at the press conference where the name of the winner of the Nobel Prize in Literature (Gao Xingjian) was announced in 2000 and doing so again in 2001. Nevertheless, he made peace with Horace Engdahl on the radio and ceased his exclamations - however, this tradition he had created  was taken over by others who still continue to exercise it. The friendship with Engdahl has been reported as on-again-off-again (2009).

Controversy 
On 17 April 2012, Fylking likened Serbs to Anders Behring Breivik on his show Gert's Värld (Gert's World). While talking about the Norwegian mass murderer, Fylking mentioned that "the world is full of these Breivik characters", and continued: "We’ve managed to catch many others as well. We caught these Serbians who acted like bloody swine and killed hundreds of thousands of fleeing people. We caught them. But do you think they are judged by the Serbians? No, the Serbians hail them as heroes. So who are the psychopaths? Is it the majority of the Serbian population that are stupid or is it just these people who are convicted of war crimes that are idiots?"

After strong public reaction including a letter of protest to the station by Serbia's ambassador to Stockholm, Dušan Crnogorčević, Fylking apologized for the statements, but was suspended from work indefinitely.

Selected filmography
 2006 - Bilar (Cars - film)
 2002 - Heja Björn (TV series)
 1997 - Adam & Eva
 1996 - Evil Ed
 1996 - Silvermannen (The Silver Man - Miniseries)
 1994 - Rapport till himlen (Report to Heaven - Miniseries)
 1992 - Nordexpressen (The Northern Express)
 1992 - Ha ett underbart liv (Have a Wonderful Life)
 1992 - Hassel - Svarta banken (Hassel - The Black Bank)
 1984 - The Man from Majorca

References

External links

Rix FM

1945 births
Swedish male television actors
Swedish male film actors
20th-century Swedish actors
21st-century Swedish actors
Swedish journalists
Christian Democrats (Sweden) politicians
Living people
Swedish radio personalities